Swartzia santanderensis is a species of flowering plant in the family Fabaceae. It is found only in Colombia.

References

santanderensis
Vulnerable plants
Endemic flora of Colombia
Taxonomy articles created by Polbot